Eamon Ryan (1946/1947 – 7 August 1979) was an Irish civil servant and murder victim. He and his wife Bernadette had two children, Peter and Dorothy.

Ryan had been studying for a master's degree at Trinity College, Dublin. On 7 August 1979, he was in the Allied Irish Bank in Tramore, County Waterford, when it was raided by the Provisional IRA. Eamonn Nolan and Aaron O'Connell were later found guilty of his murder and given life sentences. The getaway driver, Bill Hayes, served nine years in prison. Ryan's death became the subject of media attention in 2013 when his family criticized Sinn Féin for giving an award  to Hayes. In reply, Hayes said he wanted to offer his deep sympathy and apologies to Eamon Ryan's family for what they had suffered.

See also
 Mary Travers (murder victim)
 Patrick Kelly (Irish soldier)
 Murder of Thomas Oliver
 Killing of Jerry McCabe
 Murder of James Curran
 Murder of Gillian Johnston

References

External links
 Incident, cain.ulst.ac.uk
 Report, independent.ie
 Report, irishcentral.com

1940s births
Date of birth missing (living people)
Irish murder victims
People from County Waterford
People killed by the Provisional Irish Republican Army
Deaths by firearm in the Republic of Ireland
Deaths by person in the Republic of Ireland
Terrorism deaths in Ireland
People murdered in the Republic of Ireland
Living people
1979 murders in the Republic of Ireland